Klondike is a 1932 American pre-Code film directed by Phil Rosen about a man who is put on trial for manslaughter after a surgery on a patient's brain goes awry. The film is also known as The Doctor's Sacrifice in the United Kingdom. It was silent film star Priscilla Dean's final film.

Plot
Doctor Robert Cromwell (played by Lyle Talbot) is charged with murder when a patient dies after an experimental operation to remove a brain tumor.

His pilot friend, Donald Evans (Frank Hawks), convinces "Doc" to join him on a trans-Pacific trip as a means to start a new life. They plot a flight path across the Bering Strait, but rough weather blows them off course and they end up in Alaska.

There the doctor is faced with a new dilemma. Mark Armstrong (Henry B. Walthall) begs the doctor to attempt the operation on his son Jim (Jason Robards Sr.) who is crippled by a similar brain tumor. When the doctor refuses, Mark accuses him of wanting his son to die, because he is in love with Jim's fiancée, Klondike (Thelma Todd).

"Doc" acquiesces, at Klondike's insistence. Although having none of the facilities of a hospital, he believes that the operation is less likely to succeed, the longer it is delayed.

The operation seems to be a partial success. But now Jim will do anything to keep "Doc" from taking Klondike back to the States with him, even using his genius with electricity to electrocute him.

Cast
Thelma Todd as Klondike
Lyle Talbot as Dr. Robert Cromwell
Henry B. Walthall as Mark Armstrong
Jason Robards Sr. as Jim Armstrong
Priscilla Dean as Miss Porter
Tully Marshall as Editor Hinman
Patrick H. O'Malley, Jr. as Burke
Myrtle Stedman as Miss Fielding
Ethel Wales as Sadie Jones
George 'Gabby' Hayes as Tom Ross
Frank Hawks as Donald Evans

Production
The film was remade as Klondike Fury (1942).

References

External links

1932 films
1930s adventure drama films
American black-and-white films
Films set in Alaska
Monogram Pictures films
American drama films
1932 drama films
Films directed by Phil Rosen
1930s English-language films
1930s American films